Simhika is a rakshasi in Hinduism. She appears in the Ramayana, as a foe of the vanara, Hanuman, by whom she is slain.

Legend 
In the Ramayana, after meeting Mainaka, when Hanuman was crossing the ocean to Lanka, the kingdom of the rakshasa-king Ravana. Simhika was hiding in the ocean. Even as he flew overhead, she captured Hanuman's shadow with her magic. According to one account, forewarned about this creature by Sugriva, he expanded his size, and observed her vulnerability when she followed suit. He turned himself small and allowed her to swallow him, ripping her apart from within, slaying her before he resumed his journey. In other accounts, he merely kicked her to death.

References

External links
 
Characters in the Ramayana
Rakshasa in the Ramayana
Rakshasa